Franco Florio (born 30 May 2000) is an Argentine sprinter and rugby sevens player. He has won several medals in athletics at regional level.

Athletics international competitions

Personal bests
Outdoor
100 metres – 10.11 (+0.5 m/s, Cascavel 2022)
200 metres – 21.40 (-0.7 m/s, Guayaquil 2021)
Indoor
60 metres – 6.70 (Cochabamba 2022)
200 metres – 21.89 (Cochabamba 2020)

References

External links
 

2000 births
Living people
Argentine male sprinters
Argentina international rugby sevens players
21st-century Argentine people